Sound World is a UK music charity founded in 2018. Its motto is “Great music for everyone” and it works primarily in the fields of music education, music outreach, concert promotion and commissioning. Its patrons include Dame Evelyn Glennie and Armando Iannucci and it was founded by British composer Julian Leeks.

Its first major project was “The Composing Club” which visited schools in disadvantaged areas around Bristol and Bath. It resulted in pupils having their own compositions being performed and recorded by The Bristol Ensemble.

In 2019, Sound World created “In The Steps of Apollo” a music and planetarium show produced in collaboration with the planetarium at We The Curious, Bristol. It premièred on 20th July 2019, exactly 50 years after the Apollo 11 moon landing.

In 2020, the Covid-19 pandemic saw all live music events in the UK postponed. Sound World responded with the Coronavirus Fund for Freelance Musicians, a crowdfunded project supporting freelance performers with “lockdown” recording work. Composers, including Steve Reich, Dame Evelyn Glennie, Nico Muhly, Graham Fitkin, Sadie Harrison, Gavin Bryars, Mark-Anthony Turnage, Michael Ellison, John Pickard, Geoff Poole, Howard Skempton, Sally Beamish and Julian Leeks waived their commission fees and contributed specially written works which were then recorded by members of The Bristol Ensemble in lockdown.

The first release to come from the project was “The Grace of Silence” by Evelyn Glennie in January 2021. The album, called Reflections, was released on 8th December 2021 exactly one year after Margaret Keenan from the UK became the first person in the world to receive a Covid 19 vaccine outside of a clinical trial.

Sound World also holds an annual competition for young composers, the Sound World Young Composers’ Prize. With the 2020 and 2021 competition being cancelled due to the pandemic, the current holder of the prize is Jasper Eaglesfield who won with the piece “Birthday Letters.

References

Music charities based in the United Kingdom
2018 establishments in England
Charities based in Bristol